RKCB may refer to:

 RKCB, a Los Angeles-based alt-pop duo featured in "Speechless" (Candyland song)
 Roman Key Card Blackwood, a bridge convention